The number 142,857 is a Kaprekar number.

Calculation 
 1 × 142,857 = 142,857
 2 × 142,857 = 285,714
 3 × 142,857 = 428,571
 4 × 142,857 = 571,428
 5 × 142,857 = 714,285
 6 × 142,857 = 857,142
 7 × 142,857 = 999,999

If multiplying by an integer greater than 7, there is a simple process to get to a cyclic permutation of 142857. By adding the rightmost six digits (ones through hundred thousands) to the remaining digits and repeating this process until only six digits are left, it will result in a cyclic permutation of 142857:

 142857 × 8 = 1142856
 1 + 142856 = 142857

 142857 × 815 = 116428455
 116 + 428455 = 428571

 1428572 = 142857 × 142857 = 20408122449
 20408 + 122449 = 142857

Multiplying by a multiple of 7 will result in 999999 through this process:

 142857 × 74 = 342999657
 342 + 999657 = 999999

If you square the last three digits and subtract the square of the first three digits, you also get back a cyclic permutation of the number.

 8572 = 734449
 1422 = 20164
 734449 − 20164 = 714285

It is the repeating part in the decimal expansion of the rational number  = 0..

Connection to the enneagram 
The 142857 number sequence is used in the enneagram figure, a symbol of the Gurdjieff Work used to explain and visualize the dynamics of the interaction between the two great laws of the Universe (according to G. I. Gurdjieff), the Law of Three and the Law of Seven.

Other properties 
The 142857 number sequence is also found in several decimals in which the denominator has a factor of 7.

For example, consider the fractions and equivalent decimal values listed below:

  = 0....

  = 0.0...

  = 0.03...

  = 0.0...

  = 0.017...

  = 0.0...

The above decimals follow the 142857 rotational sequence.

References

 
 
 

Integers